Roubaud may refer to:
 Émile Roubaud (1882–1962), a French biologist, pathologist and entomologist
 Franz Roubaud (1856-1928), a Russian painter who created some of the largest panoramic paintings
 Jacques Roubaud (born 1932), a French poet and mathematician
 Jean-Marc Roubaud (born 1951), a member of the National Assembly of France

See also
 Rotbold I of Provence (died 1008) Count and Margrave of Provence
 Rotbold II of Provence (died 1014 or 1015), Count and Margrave of Provence